Feardorcha Ó Cellaigh, 79th and last king of Uí Maine, 43rd Chief of the Name, fl. 1584-after 1611.

Family background

Ó Cellaigh was a native of Aughrim, County Galway. His father, Cellach Ó Cellaigh married Julia Ní Cellaigh, daughter of Tadg Dubh of Gallagh. He had a brother, Hugh, who died without male issue.

Land disputes

Many of Ó Cellaigh's lands had been devastated during the Mac an Iarla wars, and subsequently disturbed during the Nine Years' War (Ireland). By 1589, he was on more favorable terms to seek from the Earl of Ormond a lease of thirty-one years of the lands his family had occupied during the previous three centuries. He succeeded Aded mac Donnchadh by 1593.

In 1596 the earl alleged breach of contract, with the result that Fearcorcha laid waste to the land. He made a peace payment in 1607 to Ormond and Thomond on payment of two hundred and twenty pounds to Thomond for this war. He died sometime after 1611 and his heirs held their estates till the aftermath of the Irish Confederate Wars (1641–1653).

Family

Feardorcha Ó Cellaigh married firstly to Catherine MacHugo, by whom he had issue four daughters. He married secondly Julia Níc Cochláin, daughter of Seán na Scuab Mac Cochláin. Among their children was Maolsheachlainn Ó Kelly, Esq., who married Honora Burke of Cloughrourke, and had issue Teige and Brian.

He was related to Colonel Charles O'Kelly (1621–1695) who fought in the Irish Confederate Wars and at the Battle of Aughrim, and was the author of a book on the Williamite Wars, The Conquest of Cyprus.

Kelly of Uí Maine

 Kings of Uí Maine
 Máine Mór, founder of the kingdom of Uí Maine, fl. 4th-century A.D
 Tadhg Mór Ua Cellaigh, (1014) King of Uí Maine and first Chief of the Name
 Peter Kelly (sports administrator) (GAA)
 Richard Kelly (The Tuam Herald)
 Mary Eva Kelly
 Mian Kelly
 Patrick Kelly (US Army officer)
 Rita Kelly
 Thomas J. Kelly (Irish nationalist)

References
 A New History of Ireland volume nine – lists and genealogies.
 ’'The Parish of Ballinasloe, Fr. Jerome A. Fahey.

People from County Galway
Feardorcha
16th-century Irish monarchs
17th-century Irish monarchs
Kings of Uí Maine
Irish chiefs of the name